Penarth Lifeboat Station is located in Penarth, Vale of Glamorgan, Wales and originally opened in 1861.

The station was closed in 1905 with services transferred to other local stations, until 1980 when the station reopened on Penarth seafront with an inshore lifeboat. The station currently operates an  lifeboat and a  lifeboat.

History
The Bristol Channel has always been a hazardous stretch of water because of the extreme tidal range. There are very strong currents or rips close inshore, with speeds that exceed 7 knots (13 km/h), for several hours at each tide. The rise and fall of the tides at Penarth are the second highest recorded anywhere in the world  The original 1861 oar-powered lifeboat was housed in a shed built near to where Penarth Yacht Club now stands at the southern end of Penarth beach and controlled by staff located at the Coastguard cottages and Trinity House lookout tower on Tower Hill near Marine Parade.

The manually powered (rowing) or "pulling boats" were 30 feet in length and were powered by 12 oars.  They had cork in their hull and shaped air-cases fore and aft.  The boats were self-righting and their double-ended designs could operate a rudder from either end, so there was no need to turn.  

In 1883 when the Yacht Club and the raised concrete esplanade were constructed along Penarth seafront an all-weather lifeboat was relocated to a yard and temporary  slipway near the Taff Vale Railway’s Marine Hotel on the Dock Beach where it remained until 1905.

The Penarth lifeboat was withdrawn from service in 1905 and all services transferred to the new Barry Dock Lifeboat Station and the station at Weston-super-mare. Penarth would have no lifeboat service for the next 75 years until a new station opened in 1980.

With the regular daily hovercraft service between Penarth to Weston-super-mare, coupled with an increase in leisure boating generated by a new water skiing club, in 1980 it was decided to re-establish lifeboat services at Penarth with the provision of an inflatable inshore lifeboat. The new boat was located at the original site next to Penarth Yacht Club, housed in an unused storehouse and launched down the yacht club’s jetty.

The current boathouse was built in 1995 to house a B class lifeboat. Also provided were a Talus MB-4H launching tractor, a workshop, an RNLI souvenir shop, a fuel store and improved crew facilities. The following year an Atlantic 21 class lifeboat arrived for a temporary duty at the station. That boat was replaced four months later by the Atlantic 75-class  and the D-class . The D-class lifeboat is launched using a TC45 tractor and carriage.

In 2010 Spirit of Penarth was withdrawn from service and replaced with an

Some historic rescues by the Penarth lifeboat

Fleet

All Weather Boats

Inshore Lifeboats

D-class

B-class

Station Honours
Framed Letter of Thanks - 2002
A framed Letter of Thanks was presented to Helmsman Simeon Rabaiotti, for rescuing a man cut off by the tide on 25 May. The ILB veered down through rocks in rough seas and in a heavy three metre swell; the anchor warp had to be cut to leave the scene.

Thanks of the Institute inscribed on Vellum - 2012
Thanks of the Institute inscribed on Vellum was presented to Jason Dunlop and Aran Pitter in recognition of their leadership, seamanship skills and actions during a rescue of a yacht in danger close to Lavernock point.

References

External links
Lifeboat Station homepage

Lifeboat stations in Wales
Transport in the Vale of Glamorgan
Transport infrastructure completed in 1861
Transport infrastructure completed in 1980
Lifeboat station
1861 establishments in Wales